Shouxiang is a metro station on Line 6 of the Hangzhou Metro in China. It was opened on 30 December 2020, together with the Line 6. It is located in the Fuyang District of Hangzhou.

References 

Hangzhou Metro stations